The Japan Agency for Medical Research and Development (AMED), created in April 2015, is an independent Japanese medical research and development organization, overseen by the Office of Healthcare Policy of Cabinet Secretariat, the Ministry of Education, Culture, Sports, Science and Technology (MEXT), the Ministry of Health, Labor and Welfare (MHLW) and the Ministry of Economy, Trade and Industry (METI).

AMED has a headquarters in the Chiyoda City district of Tokyo and international offices in London, Singapore, and Washington D.C.

References

External links 
Official Website

2015 establishments in Japan
Organizations established in 2015
Organizations based in Tokyo
Medical and health organizations based in Japan